Horndean F.C. is an English football club based in Horndean, near Portsmouth in Hampshire.

History
The club was established in 1887 and played their first match on 27 October against Red Star from Havant. They initially played at Blendworth Hill before moving to their current ground.

The club only played friendly matches until World War I, after which they joined the Waterlooville & District League, They won the league title in 1926–27, 1929–30, 1930–31 and 1931–32. They went on to join the Portsmouth League, winning Division Two in 1953–54. They were later promoted to the Premier Division, which they won in 1968–69, 1969–70 and 1970–71.

In 1972 they moved up to Division Four of the Hampshire League. By the mid-1980s they had reached Division One, and became founder members of the Wessex League in 1986. The Deans struggled to make an impact on the league and in nine seasons never once managed to finish in the top half. After finishing bottom of the league in 1994–95, they were relegated back to the Hampshire League, where they remained until rejoining the Wessex League as founder members of the new Division Two in 2004. In 2010–11 they were promoted to the Premier Division after finishing as runners-up in Division One. In October 2015 long serving manager David Carter left and on Wednesday 21 October 2015 Portsmouth Academy Coach Craig Pearce and Simon Chamberlain were appointed as successors. Craig Pearce and Simon Chamberlain took the team to fifth place, Horndeans highest ever position in the Sydenhams Wessex premier league. At the start of the 2016–2017 season Horndean FC saw the arrival of Michael Birmingham, Dutchy Holland, Jason Manna, Tony Clark and Matthew Driver. the season finished with Horndean FC in 6th place in the Sydenhams Wessex Premier division.2017-2018 Season saw the first team finish in 4th place, in 2018-2019 the team under Michael Birmingham finished second, its highest ever position in the Sydenhams Wessex premier League

Ground

Horndean play their home games at Five Heads Park, Five Heads Road, Horndean PO8 9NZ. The ground was fully enclosed in 1981. In 1986 a 50-seater stand was added and a new building housing changing rooms and hospitality facilities was constructed inside the ground, to meet Wessex League standards. Previously the changing rooms had been in the social club, on the other side of the car park. The ground seating has been increased significantly during the 2014/2015 season.

Honours
Cup Competitions
Portsmouth Junior Cup Champions 1964–65
Portsmouth Senior Cup Champions 1975–76, 2007–08, 2009–10, 2010–11
Portsmouth Senior Cup Runners Up 1996–97, 2003–04, 2004–05
Russell-Cotes Cup Runners Up 2014-15
Wessex League Cup Runners Up 1986–87
Hampshire League
Division Two Champions 1979–80
Division Three Champions 1975–76
Division Four Champions 1974–75
Portsmouth League
Premier Division Champions 1968–69, 1969–70, 1970–71
Division Two Champions 1953–54
Waterlooville & District League
Champions 1926–27, 1929–30, 1930–31, 1931–32
Wessex League
Division One Runners Up 2010–11
Premier Division Runners Up 2018-19

Current squad

Notable former players

Records
Most goals in a season: Frank Bryson – 83 in 1931–32
Most goals: Frank Bryson – 348
Best performance in FA Cup: 1st qualifying round on 9 occasions
Best performance in FA Vase: 3rd round in 2012-13

References

Official Horndean FC Website

Football clubs in Hampshire
Wessex Football League
Association football clubs established in 1887
Football clubs in England
1887 establishments in England
East Hampshire District
Portsmouth Saturday Football League